The 1987 Ontario general election was held on September 10, 1987, to elect members of the 34th Legislative Assembly of Ontario.

The governing Ontario Liberal Party, led by Premier David Peterson, was returned to power with their first majority government in half a century, and the second-largest majority government in the province's history.  Peterson had successfully managed to govern with a minority in the Legislature by obtaining the co-operation of the Ontario New Democratic Party, led by Bob Rae, in a confidence and supply agreement. It was through the NDP's support that Peterson was able to form a government, even though the Progressive Conservative Party had won a slightly larger number of seats in the previous election.

The PC Party, led by Larry Grossman, campaigned on a platform of tax cuts to stimulate the economy. Its support continued to slide, as voters opted for the change that the Liberal-NDP arrangement provided, with Grossman losing his own seat. The PCs fell to 16 seats and third place in the legislature, their worst showing in an election in half a century.

The NDP was unable to convince the bulk of voters that it should be given credit for the success of the Liberal government that it had supported. It nevertheless did receive more votes and a larger proportion of the vote than in the previous election, although the party lost six seats due to the first-past-the-post electoral system. The party became the Official Opposition for the fourth time in its history.

Results

Riding results

Algoma

Algoma—Manitoulin

Beaches—Woodbine
(incumbent) Marion Bryden (NDP) 19948
Patricia Herdman (L) 8519
John Beveridge (PC) 3022
Steve Thistle (Lbt) 533

Brampton North

Brampton South
(incumbent) Bob Callahan (L) 17913
Frank Russell (PC) 6772
Paul Ledgister (NDP) 5786
Don Best (FCP) 2946
Jim Bridgewood (Comm) 268
Garnet Brace (Lbt) 225
Malcolm Cook  158

Brantford

Brant-Haldimand

Bruce

Burlington South
(incumbent) Cam Jackson (PC) 12968
Bill Priestner (L) 12363
Judy Worsley (NDP) 4694
Don Pennell (FCP) 1125
Dan Riga (Lbt) 228

Cambridge
Mike Farnan (NDP) 11284
Claudette Millar (L) 11183
(incumbent) Bill Barlow (PC) 8752
Anneliese Steden (FCP) 1500

Carleton

Carleton East
(incumbent) Gilles Morin (L) 20706
Joan Gullen (NDP) 6105
Roland Saumure (PC) 4572
Andre Lafrance (FCP) 926

Chatham—Kent
(incumbent) Maurice Bossy (L) 13370
Brian Rice (NDP) 7623
Ron Anderson (PC) 6669
Marcy Edwards (FCP) 806
Don Carnegie 341

Cochrane North

Cochrane South

Cornwall

Don Mills
Murad Velshi (L) 11083
David Lindsay (PC) 8666
Margery Ward (NDP) 6424
David Smith 586
David Pengelly (F) 475

Dovercourt
(incumbent) Tony Lupusella (L) 10634
(incumbent) Ross McClellan (NDP) 9727
Norm Panziza, Jr. (PC) 926
D'Arcy Cain (Lbt) 342

Downsview

Dufferin—Peel

Durham Centre
Allan Furlong (L) 12885
Sarah Kelly (NDP) 9881
Stephanie Ball (PC) 8790
Harold Tauscah (G) 378

Durham East

Durham West

Norah Stoner (L) 16733
(incumbent) George Ashe (PC) 10890
Jim Wiseman (NDP) 5779
Bert Vermeer (FCP) 898

Durham—York

Bill Ballinger (L) 12369
(incumbent) Ross Stevenson (PC) 11887
Donna Kelly (NDP) 5549
Ken Canning (FCP) 1070

Eglinton
Dianne Poole (L) 15106
(incumbent) David McFadden (PC) 14411
Michael Lee (NDP) 3789
Richard Lubbock (Lbt) 324
John Stifel 137

Elgin
Marietta Roberts (L) 13310
(incumbent) Ron McNeil (PC) 10873
Gord Campbell (NDP) 7674
Ray Monteith (F) 546

Essex—Kent
(incumbent) Jim McGuigan (L) 12591
(incumbent) Pat Hayes (NDP) 11478
John Ashton (PC) 2758
Tim McGuire (FCP) 1229

Essex South

Etobicoke—Humber
(incumbent) Jim Henderson (L) 21644
Avie Flaherty (PC) 8062
Peter Sutherland (NDP) 4511
George Hartwell (FCP) 1237

Etobicoke—Lakeshore
(incumbent) Ruth Grier (NDP) 14821
Frank Sgarlata (L) 12454
Al Kolyn (PC) 4760
Michael Doyle (FCP) 1203

Etobicoke—Rexdale

Etobicoke West
Linda LeBourdais (L) 15757
Doug Holyday (PC) 9664
Phil Jones (NDP) 5784
Judy Johnson (FCP) 1890
Robert Dunk (Lbt) 498

Fort William
Lyn McLeod (L) 11168
(incumbent) Mickey Hennessy (PC) 9705
Don Smith (NDP) 7861
John Maclennan (Comm) 300

Fort York
Bob Wong (L) 9593
Joe Pantalone (NDP) 9456
Tom Pang (PC) 2084
Paul “No Government” Barker (Lbt) 427
Andrew Scorer (G) 243
Glen Magder (F) 186
Bill Whelan  181
Ronald Rodgers (Ind [Communist Party of North America]) 154

Frontenac—Addington
(incumbent) Larry South (L) 11628
Bob Lucas (PC) 7407
Lars Thompson (NDP) 4996
Ross Baker  667

Grey—Owen Sound
Ron Lipsett (L) 14298
Bill Murdoch (PC) 12364
Cathy Hird (NDP) 5924
Tom Clark (FCP) 1946

Guelph
(incumbent) Rick Ferraro (L) 18445
Derek Fletcher (NDP) 9119
Bob Pierce (PC) 5383
Craig Sanderson  562

Halton Centre

Halton North
Walt Elliot (L) 11644
Dave Whiting (PC) 6920
Fern Wolf (NDP) 5796

Hamilton Centre
(incumbent) Lily Oddie Munro (L) 13636
Brian Hinkley (NDP) 10333
Gerald Fruewith (PC) 2600

Hamilton East
(incumbent) Bob Mackenzie (NDP) 16421
David Bach (L) 9890
Tommy Tarpos (PC) 1915
Bob Jaggard (Comm) 673

Hamilton Mountain
(incumbent) Brian Charlton (NDP) 14743
Jane Milanetti (L) 13111
John Smith (PC) 6580

Hamilton West
(incumbent) Richard Allen (NDP) 13430
Mary Kiss (L) 12336
Don Ross (PC) 5862

Hastings—Peterborough
(incumbent) Jim Pollock (PC) 9910
Carman Metcalfe (L) 8705
Elmer Buchanan (NDP) 6579

High Park—Swansea
David Fleet (L) 9637
(incumbent) Yuri Shymko (PC) 8823
Elaine Ziemba (NDP) 8764
Bob Cumming (Lbt) 660

Huron

(incumbent) Jack Riddell (L) 16099
Nico Peters (PC) 6725
Paul Klopp (NDP) 3841

Kenora
Frank Miclash (L) 7943
Doug Miranda (NDP) 6845
Mark Duggan (PC) 4824

Kingston and the Islands
(incumbent) Ken Keyes (L) 13141
Gary Wilson (NDP) 6402
Tom Annis (PC) 5910
Steven Kaasgaard (G) 511

Kitchener
(incumbent) David Cooke (L) 15373
Sue Coulter (NDP) 8379
Barbara Fraser (PC) 4226
John Meenan (FCP) 1100
Ed Halbach (Ind [Humanist]) 290

Kitchener—Wilmot

(incumbent) John Sweeney  (L) 18151
Mike Cooper (NDP) 7503
Dorothy Angel (PC) 5218

Lake Nipigon
(incumbent) Gilles Pouliot (NDP) 8446
Herman Mannila (L) 3606
Vic Fournel (PC) 1129

Lambton
(incumbent) David William Smith (L) 11385
Bill Steadman (PC) 8826
Grant Reynolds (NDP) 2914
Peter Westfall (FCP) 2399

Lanark—Renfrew
Douglas Wiseman (PC) 13902
Bob Pugh (L) 13141
Don Page (NDP) 5486

Lawrence
(incumbent) Joseph Cordiano (L) 15332
Evelyn Nurialdo (NDP) 8201
David Perry (PC) 5379

Leeds—Grenville
(incumbent) Bob Runciman (PC) 14787
Jim Jordan (L) 14589
Geri Sheedy (NDP) 4869

Lincoln
Harry Pelissero (L) 12320
(incumbent) Philip Andrewes (PC) 11284
Ron Hansen (NDP) 6207

London Centre
(incumbent) David Peterson (L) 18194
Marion Boyd (NDP) 9266
Dennis McKaig (PC) 3864
Brenda Rowe (FCP) 695
Lloyd Walker (F) 589
Stunning Bentley  375

London North
(incumbent) Ron Van Horne (L) 22452
Diane Whiteside (NDP) 7961
Lucky Clark (PC) 7177
Elvin Mizzau (FCP) 611
Barry Malcolm (F) 537

London South
(incumbent) Joan Smith (L) 20046
Vaughan Minor (PC) 7723
David Winninger (NDP) 7074
Paul Picard (FCP) 861
Robert Metz (F) 430

Markham
(incumbent) Don Cousens (PC) 19224
Gail Newall (L) 18543
Anne Swarbrick (NDP) 4323
Rina Puleo (FCP) 1403

Middlesex
(incumbent) Doug Reycraft (L) 17600
Renie Long (PC) 7689
Michael Wyatt (NDP) 5720
Bill Giesen (FCP) 2664
Marc Emery (F) 499

Mississauga East
John Sola (L) 16245
(incumbent) Bud Gregory (PC) 10372
Sal Manni (NDP) 4864
Bill Frampton (F) 761

Mississauga North
(incumbent) Steve Offer (L) 14604
John Moszynski (NDP) 6153
Gabe Spoletine (PC) 5309

Mississauga South
(incumbent) Margaret Marland (PC) 13854
Claudette MacKay-Lassonde (L) 13255
Barry Stevens (NDP) 4976
Chris Balabanian (F) 712

Mississauga West
Steve Mahoney (L) 23482
Darwin Kealey (PC) 9138
Paul Simon (NDP) 6280

Muskoka—Georgian Bay

Nepean

Hans Daigeler (L) 13951
(incumbent) Bob Mitchell (PC) 10315
Larry Jones (NDP) 4526

Niagara Falls

(incumbent) Vince Kerrio (L) 13600
Margaret Harrington (NDP) 7936
Ed Sherar (PC) 5066

Niagara South

(incumbent) Ray Haggerty (L) 11740
Doug Martin (PC) 4645
Camilla Gyorffy (NDP) 4396

Nickel Belt

(incumbent) Floyd Laughren (NDP) 9849
Leo Pevato (L) 3863
Evelyn Dutrisac (PC) 3208

Nipissing
(incumbent) Mike Harris (PC) 15744
Marthe Smith (L) 11690
Sandra Clifford (NDP) 2961
Brendan Purtill (FCP) 672

Norfolk
(incumbent) Gord Miller (L) 17313
Norm Jamison (NDP) 8346
Ian Birnie (PC) 5742

Northumberland
Joan Fawcett (L) 14451
(incumbent) Howard Sheppard (PC) 13075
Judi Armstrong (NDP) 4372
Brant Fotheringham (FCP) 836
Adrian O'Connell (G) 242

Oakville South

Doug Carrothers (L) 13241
(incumbent) Terry O'Connor (PC) 11950
Tim Cooper (NDP) 3080
Chris Kowalcuk (G) 1357

Oakwood

Chaviva Hošek (L) 11192
(incumbent) Tony Grande (NDP) 9861
Irene Paparo-Stein (PC) 1573
Geoff Da Silva (Comm) 556

Oriole

(incumbent) Elinor Caplan (L) 16206
Fredelle Brief (PC) 5659
Judy Rebick (NDP) 4470
George Graham (Lbt) 822

Oshawa

(incumbent) Mike Breaugh (NDP) 12957
Cathy O'Flynn (L) 10041
Frank Snyder (PC) 4076
James Delaney (FCP) 1184

Ottawa Centre

Richard Patten (L) 13867
(incumbent) Evelyn Gigantes (NDP) 11780
Greg Vezina (PC) 3159
John Turmel  598

Ottawa East

(incumbent) Bernard Grandmaitre (L) 18959
Alex Connely (NDP) 4137
Corinne Prince (PC) 2435

Ottawa—Rideau

Yvonne O'Neill (L) 14179
Pam Forward (PC) 8068
Bea Murray (NDP) 6000

Ottawa South

Dalton McGuinty, Sr. (L) 15952
Michael McSweeney (PC) 9365
Penina Coopersmith (NDP) 6038

Ottawa West

Oxford

Charlie Tatham (L) 14939
(incumbent) Dick Treleaven (PC) 12065
Wayne Colbran (NDP) 6606
Margaret De Boer (FCP) 1410
Kaye Sargent (Lbt) 466

Parkdale

(incumbent) Tony Ruprecht (L) 13430
Vasco Dos Santos (NDP) 3961
Charles Olito (PC) 798
Carla Marmelo (FCP) 389
Danny Hunt (Lbt) 283
Gordon Massie (Comm) 184
Camilo Tiqui  176
Nancy Van Schouwen (Ind [Humanist]) 113

Parry Sound

(incumbent) Ernie Eves (PC) 11332
Rollie Boissonneault (L) 6935
Bill Pabst (NDP) 2231
Warren Edgar (FCP) 647

Perth

(incumbent) Hugh Edighoffer (L) 18037
Warren Ham (NDP) 6080
Ron Christie (PC) 5357

Peterborough

Peter Adams (L) 15098
Linda Slavin (NDP) 10641
Doris Brick (PC) 8480
Alex Calder (FCP) 3057
John Conlin (Lbt) 344

Port Arthur

Taras Kozyra (L) 13747
Chris Southcott (NDP) 11828
Evelyn Dodds (PC) 4419

Prescott and Russell

(incumbent) Jean Poirier (L) 26811
Yves Deschamps (NDP) 4460
Roland Demers (PC) 4100

Prince Edward—Lennox

Keith MacDonald (L) 11961
Dennis Tompkins (PC) 9882
Paul Johnson (NDP) 4724

Quinte

(incumbent) Hugh O'Neil (L) 17151
Doug Brewer (PC) 6543
Gene Morosan (NDP) 3520
Allan Bristol (Lbt) 413

Rainy River

Howard Hampton (NDP) 5538
Dan Pierroz (L) 4631
(incumbent) Jack Pierce (PC) 3487

Renfrew North

(incumbent) Sean Conway (L) 18507
Stu Mark (PC) 5652
Ish Theilheimer (NDP) 3958
Shirley Witt (FCP) 1385

Riverdale

(incumbent) David Reville (NDP) 10321
Jim Karygiannis (L) 8562
Bob Dodd (PC) 3285
Debra Bojman (G) 330
Byron Garby (Lbt) 292
Maggie Bizzell (Comm) 210

St. Andrew—St. Patrick

Ron Kanter (L) 14159
(incumbent) Larry Grossman (PC) 10483
Gladys Rothman (NDP) 5608
Alex MacDonald (Lbt) 761

St. Catharines

St. Catharines—Brock

Mike Dietsch (L) 10822
(incumbent) Peter Partington (PC) 8821
Christel Haeck (NDP) 6514

St. George—St. David
(incumbent) Ian Scott (L) 15051
(incumbent) Susan Fish (PC) 7996
John Campey (NDP) 5658
Michael Beech (Lbt) 721

Sarnia

(incumbent) Andy Brandt (PC) 12964
Joan Link-Mellon (L) 10303
Catherine Giles (NDP) 4552
Terry Burrell (FCP) 1475
Margaret Coe (Lbt) 559

Sault Ste. Marie

(incumbent) Karl Morin-Strom (NDP) 19064
Albert Ferranti (L) 16381
Udo Rauk (PC) 3464

Scarborough—Agincourt

Gerry Phillips (L) 19101
David Kho (NDP) 7021
Adrienne Johnson (PC) 6284
Barry Coyne (Lbt) 794

Scarborough Centre

Cindy Nicholas (L) 11921
Menno Vorster (NDP) 8525
(incumbent) Bill Davis (PC) 7217
Chris Douros (FCP) 827
Martin Weatherall  550

Scarborough East

(incumbent) Ed Fulton (L) 16944
Mary Cook (NDP) 7048
Russ Bastow (PC) 5390
Jim McIntosh (Lbt) 869
Greg Knittl (G) 337

Scarborough—Ellesmere
Frank Faubert (L) 12422
(incumbent) David Warner (NDP) 11941
Gail Brewer (PC) 5445

Scarborough North

(incumbent) Alvin Curling (L) 20021
Peter Lam (PC) 5861
Nick Summers (NDP) 4509
Louis Di Rocco (FCP) 1371

Scarborough West
(incumbent) Richard Johnston (NDP) 13330
Joe Pacione (L) 10094
Brian Clark (PC) 3881
Stephen Jalsevic (FCP) 1035
George Dance (Lbt) 483

Simcoe Centre

Bruce Owen (L) 15474
(incumbent) Earl Rowe (PC) 12982
Fred Ruemper (NDP) 7265

Simcoe East
(incumbent) Al McLean (PC) 12543
Butch Orser (L) 11737
Fayne Bullen (NDP) 9699

Simcoe West

(incumbent) George McCague (PC) 11678
Gary Johnson (L) 11372
Noel St-Laurent (NDP) 4788

Stormont—Dundas—Glengarry & East Grenville
(incumbent) Noble Villeneuve (PC) 10771
Gerry Rosenquist (L) 10164
Gordon McGregor   4784
Arthur Carkner (NDP) 2345

Sudbury

Sterling Campbell (L) 12788
(incumbent) Jim Gordon (PC) 10158
Sharon Murdock (NDP) 9260
Ted McKeown  285

Sudbury East

Shelley Martel (NDP) 15179
Claude Mayer (L) 9540
Gary Peck (PC) 2890

Timiskaming

(incumbent) David Ramsay (L) 10218
Ollie Rivard (NDP) 5871
Ed Havrot (PC) 4870

Victoria—Haliburton

(incumbent) John Eakins (L) 16287
Arthur Ward (PC) 5856
Ivan Moore (NDP) 4251
Diane Roblin-Lee (FCP) 2403

Waterloo North

(incumbent) Herbert Epp (L) 16792
Elizabeth Witmer (PC) 8681
Richard Hastings (NDP) 5785
Ian O'Neill (Lbt) 818

Welland—Thorold

(incumbent) Mel Swart (NDP) 17490
Mark Larose (L) 9855
Giulio Roca (PC) 2167
Angela Braun (FCP) 706

Wellington
(incumbent) Jack Johnson (PC) 10797
Bill Benson (L) 10334
Burna Wilton (NDP) 5159

Wentworth East

Shirley Collins (L) 16153
Sharon Lehnert (NDP) 8676
Barbara Vance (PC) 5577
Ann Stasiuk  475

Wentworth North

(incumbent) Chris Ward (L) 16150
Gary Tilley (PC) 7107
Lynn Spencer (NDP) 6641

Willowdale

Gino Matrundola (L) 15543
Charles Harnick (PC) 11509
Batya Hebdon (NDP) 5774
Earl Epstein (Lbt) 985

Wilson Heights

(incumbent) Monte Kwinter (L) 17007
Jennifer Paton (NDP) 6697
David Farb (PC) 5879

Windsor—Riverside

(incumbent) Dave Cooke (NDP) 17162
Rick Limoges (L) 11257
Terry Hrynyk (PC) 842
Mark Kahabka (FCP) 509

Windsor—Sandwich

(incumbent) Bill Wrye (L) 14888
George Dadamo (NDP) 12535
Beth Cooper (PC) 1965

Windsor—Walkerville

(incumbent) Mike Ray (L) 14361
Donna Champagne (NDP) 13415
Jerry Kovacs (PC) 1553
Mike Longmoore (Comm) 335

York Centre

(incumbent) Greg Sorbara (L) 27096
Doug Mason (PC) 8605
Joe Licastro (NDP) 7692

York East
(incumbent) Christine Hart (L) 15683
Peter Oyler (PC) 7352
Sophia Apostolides (NDP) 7056
Chris Frazer (Comm) 527

York Mills

Brad Nixon (L) 14272
Gordon Chong (PC) 11955
Steve Shorter (NDP) 3195
Joe Kyriakakis (Lbt) 582

York—Mackenzie

Charles Beer (L) 14177
John Cole (PC) 8992
Susan Wakeling (NDP) 6092

York South

(incumbent) Bob Rae (NDP) 13190
Alan Tonks (L) 12857
Fred De Francesco (PC) 1544
Dusan Kubias (Lbt) 411

Yorkview

(incumbent) Claudio Polsinelli (L) 11499
Sheila Lambrinos (NDP) 6148
Tony Marzilli (Ind [Trudeau Liberal]) 2507
Fareed Khan (PC) 1037
Russ Jackman (Lbt) 674

Byelections after 1987
 March 31, 1988: London North, following the December 31, 1987 resignation of Ron Van Horne:
Dianne Cunningham (PC) 13858
Elaine Pensa (L) 10356
Diane Whiteside (NDP) 6799
Brenda Rowe (FCP) 1419
Barry Malcolm (F) 548
John Turmel  115

November 3, 1988: Welland—Thorold, following the October 24, 1988 resignation of Mel Swart:

Peter Kormos (NDP) 13933
Mike Lottridge (L) 9819
Brian O'Brine (PC) 4574
Barry Fitzgerald (F) 260
John Turmel  187

Dalton McGuinty, Sr., MPP for Ottawa South, died on March 16, 1990. No byelection was held; the seat was vacant until the 1990 election in September.

See also
Politics of Ontario
List of Ontario political parties
Premier of Ontario
Leader of the Opposition (Ontario)
Independent candidates, 1987 Ontario provincial election

1987 elections in Canada
1987
1987 in Ontario
September 1987 events in Canada